The 2019 Neste World RX of Latvia was the ninth round of the sixth season of the FIA World Rallycross Championship. The event was held at Biķernieku Kompleksā Sporta Bāze, in the Latvian capital of Riga.

Supercar 

Source

Heats

Semi-finals 

 Semi-Final 1

 Semi-Final 2

Final

Standings after the event 

Source

 Note: Only the top six positions are included.

References

External links 

|- style="text-align:center"
|width="35%"|Previous race:2019 World RX of France
|width="40%"|FIA World Rallycross Championship2019 season
|width="35%"|Next race:2019 World RX of South Africa
|- style="text-align:center"
|width="35%"|Previous race:2018 World RX of Latvia
|width="40%"|World RX of Latvia
|width="35%"|Next race:2020 World RX of Latvia
|- style="text-align:center"

Latvia
2019 in Latvian sport
September 2019 sports events in Europe